The Samata Party (SAP)  is a political party in India, initially formed in 1994 by George Fernandes and Nitish Kumar, now led by Uday Mandal its National President. Samata Party once launched Nitish Kumar as the Chief Minister of Bihar. It was an offshoot of the Janata Dal, with the alleged casteism of the parent party being the reason given for the split. The party has socialist leanings, and at one point wielded considerable political and social influence in North India, particularly in Bihar. In 2003 most Samata Party members joined  Janata Dal (United). Only a faction led by MP Brahmanand Mandal remained in the Samata party and continued to use the party name and symbols.

History

In the general elections of 1996, the Samata Party formed an alliance with the Bharatiya Janta Party and won eight seats, six of which were in Bihar and one each in Uttar Pradesh and Odisha. Before the election, the party was largely rooted only in Bihar. In the 1998 general elections, again in alliance with Bharatiya Janta Party, it won twelve seats, ten from Bihar and two from Uttar Pradesh.

In March 2000, Nitish Kumar was elected leader of the NDA for Chief Minister of Bihar post. On 3 March, he, sworn in as the Chief Minister of Bihar for the first time at the behest of the Vajpayee Government in the center. NDA and allies had 151 MLA whereas Lalu Prasad Yadav had 159 MLA in the 324-member house. Both alliances were less than the majority mark, 163. Nithish resigned because he could not prove his numbers in the house.

Radhabinod Koijam became the second chief minister from Samata Party when was sworn in as Chief Minister of Manipur on 15 February 2001. The government was however, short-lived. The coalition he was leading fell in May the same year.

In the 1999 Loksabha election, Samata Party was in an informal alliance with the Lok Shakti and the Janata Dal(U). A proposal to merge the three into a single party was called off in January 2000 by George Fernandes who said the party would contest in the 2000 Bihar Legislative Assembly election on its own.

2003 Split and merger with JD (U) 
In October 2003, George Fernandes, the president of the Samata Party, announced that the party would be completely merging with the Janata Dal (United). The Janata Dal (United) was part of the ruling coalition in the National Democratic Alliance.

Samata Party Member of parliament (Lok Sabha) Brahmanand Mandal was opposed to the merger split with the other members. Mandal was the leader of the minority faction opposing the merger. Since all the members did not support the official merge, and Brahmanand's faction challenged the merger of the party in front of ECI, the merger wasn't officially recognized by the Election Commission of India.  The Election Commission of India decided that the merger was not technically complete and so a faction was allowed to function under the Samata Party name.

Party leader Sharad Yadav, said that the ECI decision would have no effect on his merger plans as all candidates of Samata Party would be contesting the upcoming 2004 Lok Sabha election as candidate of Janata Dal United on the election symbol of Arrow.

Most members of the party merged with JDU as proposed however a small faction of Samata Party continued using the name Samata party under the leadership of Brahmanand Mandal.

Samata Party after 2004 
In the 2009 general elections for the 14th Lok Sabha (2009-2014), it had contested in 11 seats and was defeated in all of them. It had secured a total of 31324 votes which was only 0.02 percent of the total number of votes cast in that state.

For the Lok Sabha elections of 2014, the Samata Party decided to forgo any alliance, stating that it would not ally with the Congress.
Due to the departure of all the bigwigs from the Samata Party to Janata Dal (United), the party started shrinking gradually. Due to its poor election performance, it began to lose popularity and was almost on the verge of closure. In 2020, the leadership of the party was given to Uday Mandal, he started restructuring it.

Fernandes return in Samata Party in 2007
In 2007, George Fernandes left JD(U) and joined Samata Party along with their supporters, JD(U) general secretary and spokesman Shiv Kumar and senior leader Aneel Hegde, several other leaders and workers from various states left the JD(U) to join the Samata Party on the occasion. These included the Gujarat party unit president Praveensinh Jadeja, Andhra Pradesh unit chief Narasimha Reddy, Uttarakhand party chief Anurag Kumar and suspended party MLA from Bihar Chhedi Paswan. Also present on the occasion was former MP Brahmanand Mandal, the current president of Samata Party who had refused to join the JD(U) at the time of merger.

Ideology 
The party follows the socialist ideology, in particular that of Ram Manohar Lohia.

Electoral Performances

Lok Sabha (Lower House)

Vidhan Sabha (Lower House)

List of Chief Ministers

Symbol crisis
The Election Commission of India allotted the "Flaming Torch" symbol to Shiv Sena (Uddhav Balasaheb Thackeray), the Samata Party raise objection against it. A petition filed in Delhi High Court, Samata Party through Uday Kr Mandal its President vs Election Commission of India. A single bench of Justice Sanjeev Narula dismissed the case, Samata party appeal in double bench of Judges. Chief Justice Satish Chandra Sharma & Justice Subramontium Prasad again dismissed that appeal. In Uttar Pradesh Local Body Election 2022, Samata Party got their symbol, now the Shiv Sena (Uddhav Balasaheb Thackeray) & Samata Party both have the "Flaming Torch or Mashal".

See also
 List of political parties in India

References 

 
Socialist parties in India
Janata Parivar
Political parties established in 1994
1994 establishments in India
Janata Dal